Danilo II may refer to:
 Danilo II (Archbishop of Serbs), primate of the Serbian Orthodox Church (1324–1337)
 Danilo II, Metropolitan of Montenegro, in office (1961–1990)

See also
 Danilo II Petrovic Njegos
 Danilo II, Crown Prince of Montenegro
 Danilo I (disambiguation)
 Danilo III (disambiguation)